Cockburn Power Station (CKB) is a power station in Naval Base, Western Australia within the City of Kwinana. The station was commissioned by Western Power Corporation in 2003 and is immediately south of the closed Kwinana Power Station. It has a 160 MW natural gas powered Alstom GT13E2 gas turbine which provides steam to an 80 MW steam turbine that together generate a total 240 MW of electricity. It was the first combined cycle gas turbine power station in Western Australia. It came under the control of Verve Energy in 2006 when Western Power was split, and since 2014 has been under control of Synergy.

References

External links 

 
 

Buildings and structures in Perth, Western Australia
Natural gas-fired power stations in Western Australia